Matus ovatus is a species of predaceous diving beetle in the family Dytiscidae. It is found in North America.

Subspecies
These two subspecies belong to the species Matus ovatus:
 Matus ovatus blatchleyi Leech, 1941 i c g
 Matus ovatus ovatus Leech, 1941 i c g
Data sources: i = ITIS, c = Catalogue of Life, g = GBIF, b = Bugguide.net

References

Further reading

 
 

Dytiscidae
Articles created by Qbugbot
Beetles described in 1941